The Police of the Republic of Armenia is the national police of Armenia. The acting head is Vahe Ghazaryan, in office since 8 June 2020.

History

Soviet era
The first police service of Armenia was formed in 1918, under the Ministry of Internal Affairs of the First Republic of Armenia. On April 21, 1920, a Militia was formed in Yerevan based on the Soviet model. It was later renamed to the People's Commissariat of Internal Affairs of the Armenian SSR or the NKVD of the Armenian SSR, which was the Armenian subordinate to the NKVD headquarters in Moscow. In 1929, the NKVD of the Armenian SSR was dissolved and was reestablished in July 1934 as a reorganized political department. During World War II, the present-day building of the Armenian Police was built. The Armenian Regiment of Interior Forces of the USSR Ministry of Internal Affairs was established in 1963, and the Headquarters of the Ministry of Internal Affairs of the Armenian SSR was founded in 1965.

Modern Armenia
On June 21, 1992, by order of President Levon Ter-Petrosyan, the Ministry of Internal Affairs of Armenia was formed from the former Soviet Internal Troops. The ministry was active until December 2002, when the ministry, along with the Ministry of National Security, was reorganised into a non-ministerial institution, with the Ministry of Internal Affairs becoming the Police of Armenia. The Armenian Ministry of Justice recommended the re-establishment of the ministry headed by a cabinet member in a three-year strategy of police reforms proposed to the government in 2019. As part of a major structural reform of the national police service, Prime Minister Nikol Pashinian announced plans to recreate the Interior Ministry. A patrol service became active in June 2021.

On 16 September 2021, the Armenian Government signed a strategic cooperation agreement with Europol.

Leadership
The activities of the police are directed by the chief of the police, who is appointed by the president of Armenia at the nomination of the prime minister of Armenia. The chief has one first deputy and several deputies, appointed by the president upon nomination by the chief.

The commander of the police troops is appointed by the president and serves as ex officio deputy chief of the police. Each of the deputy chiefs is assigned a sphere of responsibility by the chief of police, who is also assisted by a group of Advisers.

List of leaders (since 2003)

 Hayk Haroutyunyan (January 2003 – May 29, 2008)
 Alik Sargsyan (May 29, 2008 – November 1, 2011)
 Vladimir Gasparyan (November 1, 2011 – May 10, 2018)
 Valeri Osipyan (May 10, 2018 – September 19, 2019)
 Arman Sargsyan (September 19, 2019 – June 8, 2020)
 Vahe Ghazaryan (June 8, 2020 – Present)

Central Body and Regional Divisions
The Police are organised into the Central Body, and 11 geographic divisions. There is one police department for the city of Yerevan, and one for each of the 10 Provinces. The Departments of the Central Body are:

 Headquarters
 Combating Organized Crime Main Department
 Criminal Investigations Main Department
 Investigative Main Department
 Public Order Department
 Personnel Department
 Information Centre
 Public Relations and Press Department
 Finances and Economic Affairs Department
 Administration
 Department of Road Inspection
 Passports and Visas Department
 State Protection Department
 Criminal Forensics and Legal Affairs Department
 National Central Bureau (NCB) of Interpol

National Central Bureau
The NCB is divided into three divisions:

 Division for international search and general crime – responsible for conducting criminal investigations of an operational nature, preparing international notice requests and sending them to the General Secretariat for publication, providing liaison and co-ordination activities, maintaining criminal records, implementing criminal investigations concerning the search for wanted persons. The division comprises 6 police officers including a head of division.
Division for the analysis and processing of criminal intelligence – division deals with the following areas: legal matters, analysis and processing of criminal intelligence on drug trafficking, fraud, organized crime, terrorism, corruption, counterfeiting, crimes against human beings, international relations support, general reference sources, methodological data, etc. It comprises 6 police officers including a head of division.
Division for telecommunications and technical support – division deals with matters relating to information technology systems, providing telecommunications services and technical support for the NCB. It consists of 7 police officers including a head of division.

Public Relations and Press Department 
The Committee of Public Relations (part of the Public Relations and Press Department) was founded on 21 March 1994.

The department also maintains a 42-member Police Band (Հայաստանի ոստիկանության նվագախումբը, Vostikanutyan Nvagaxumb) based in Yerevan which is currently led by Baghdasar Grigoryan. The band was created on 1 August 1972.  It performs similar functions to the Band of the Armenian Army General Staff, taking part in the most important events of the police and the state. In 2019, it performed at the graduation party of Dubai Police Academy.

Police Troops 
The Armenian Police Troops are composed mainly of personnel from the former Police Special Forces (SDFs) and the Rapid Reaction Forces (SDFs), who have actively participated in all combat operations carried out by the former Armenian Internal Troops and the Soviet Internal Troops. On 21 June 1992, the Internal Troops of the Ministry of Internal Affairs were formed by decree of Levon Ter-Petrosyan. The day of formation of the police troops is celebrated every year, on 21 June. In February 1999 the Deputy Minister of the Interior and Commander of the Internal Troops, Major General Artsrun Makarian, was found shot dead. On 14 December 2004, the Internal Troops were renamed to the Police Troops. In 2009, there was a transition from conscription to contract service.  In 2013 the International Institute for Strategic Studies attributed the force with four paramilitary battalions, 55 AIFV including 44 BMP-1, and 24 wheeled armoured personnel carriers.

The military units of the Internal Troops of the Armenian Ministry of Internal Affairs had a wide range of activities: including the protection of special facilities, maintenance of public order, public security service, preliminary training of conscripts, and training of non-commissioned officers. The Internal Troops had a helicopter (aviation) unit, which, being provided with appropriate helicopters, performed various transportation services during combat operations.

Wars 
It took part in the Four-Day War and the Second Nagorno-Karabakh War. During the latter war, sixty-five policemen were killed and six were considered missing. About 3,000 officers from the police troops went to the battlefront in shifts and took part in battles for Karvachar, Haterk, Jrakan, Berdzor and Shushi-Lisagor road. In 2018, it was deployed to the in the Armenian-Azerbaijani border. It also took part in the First Nagorno-Karabakh War.

Special Operations Forces
It has carried out raids in the places of alleged "thieves' gatherings". It took part in the "Cobalt-2016" joint exercise of special forces units of the CSTO at the Marshal Baghramyan Training Ground of the Ministry of Defense.

Personnel

Oath 
Persons serving in the Police, in front of the state flag of Armenia, in accordance with the procedure established by the Government of Armenia, take an oath with the following content:

Uniforms
Decrees passed in October 2002 and April 2003 set the rules for police officers' uniforms.

Weapons 
Police personnel are armed primarily with Soviet-made firearms and ammunition, including Makarov PM and Tokarev TT-33 handguns, and AKS, AKM, and AK-74 automatic rifles.

Police Workers Day 
Celebrated on 16 April, Police Workers Day in Armenia commemorates personnel of the Police Central Body and the Police Troops. It was first celebrated in 2002 and was introduced year earlier by the National Assembly of Armenia. Traditionally, the President of Armenia and/or the Prime Minister of Armenia receives the salute at a ceremony in the Yerevan police headquarters.

Ranks 
Police ranks are classified into the following groups:

 Higher ranks
 Colonel General of Police
 Lieutenant General of Police
 Major General of Police
 Chief ranks
 Police Colonel
 Senior ranks
 Police Lieutenant Colonel
 Subaltern ranks
 Police Major
 Police Captain
 Senior Police Lieutenant
 Police Lieutenant
 Junior ranks
 Senior Police NCO
 Police NCO
 Police Starshina
 Senior Police Sergeant
 Police Sergeant
 Junior Police Sergeant

Education 
The Police Academy of Armenia, is the successor to the Secondary School of the Internal Troops of the Ministry of Internal Affairs, which was founded in 1984. During the Soviet era, the Yerevan Higher School of the Ministry of Internal Affairs operated in the country.

Equipment

Small arms

Armenian Police Vehicles

See also 
Crime in Armenia
Law of Armenia
Ministry of Justice (Armenia)
National Security Service (Armenia)
Prosecutor General of Armenia

References

Links 

 Official Website
 POLICE RA Vostikanutyun on YouTube
 Performances of the Police Band in 2017 and 2018
 The Police Honour Guard

National Central Bureaus of Interpol
Armenia
 
Law enforcement in Armenia
Government agencies of Armenia